Beyond Mars was a science fiction comic strip written by Jack Williamson and drawn by Lee Elias. The Sunday strip ran in the New York Daily News from February 17, 1952, to March 13, 1955, initially as a full tabloid page and, near the end, as a half tab. It is set in the same universe as the Williamson novels Seetee Ship and Seetee Shock.

The creation of Beyond Mars happened in an unusual way—because of a bad review. The New York Times reviewed a Williamson novel, stating that his writing "ranks only slightly above that of comic strip adventures." The review was read by Daily News editor Ana Barker who immediately contacted Williamson, hired him to script a similar comic strip and teamed him with illustrator Elias.

Characters and story
The strip's storyline was loosely based on Seetee Ship: in the year 2191, freelance pilot and "spatial engineer" Mike Flint carried out odd jobs - usually on behalf of beautiful women - across the wild frontier of the asteroid belt. Flint had a base on the small habitable asteroid of Brooklyn Rock, from where he and his alien partner/sidekick Tham Thmith (a Venusian with metal-based biology and a speech impediment) operated a classic Art-Deco rocketship powered by antimatter.

As the product of a notable SF writer, the strip was somewhat more scientifically accurate than most of its contemporaries, at least by period standards. The pre-Mariner Venus and Mars were depicted as the homes of intelligent species (the Martians being essentially sentient bivalves), and even very small asteroids could be made to retain a habitable biosphere via gravitational manipulation.

Comics historian Dave Karlen reviewed:
In 1952 the New York News wanted to celebrate their success from a steady increase in newspaper circulation and decided an exclusive feature created for their publication would be just the ticket... It is said Chester Gould suggested many of the story lines and helped Williamson from time to time on a proper way to present a comic strip plot. This colorful space-opera drama with a stellar Dick Tracy feel was beautifully rendered in the "Noel Sickles School" by Elias with its amazingly detailed exotic locals, amusing alien creatures, beautiful women and lots of two-fisted action. But as with many strips over time, the New York News believed their creation did not live up to its expectations and cut the size to a half-page in late 1954, which probably contributed to its untimely demise on March 13, 1955 as the creative team wrapped up some final loose ends in the last Sunday.

Reprints

In 1987, the entire strip was reprinted in two Blackthorne trade paperbacks. Blackthorne also reprinted it as series of comic books.
IDW Publishing reprinted the entire strip in an oversized hardback book in October 2015.

References

Sources
Daily News Sunday comics section (1952–55)
John Clute and Peter Nicholls, editor, The Encyclopedia of Science Fiction (Jack Williamson entry), St. Martin's Press, 1993.  
Jack Williamson and Lee Elias, Shel Dorf (editor), Beyond Mars (two volumes), Blackthorne, 1987.

External links
Jack Williamson and anti-matter

American comic strips
Science fiction comic strips
Blackthorne Publishing titles
1952 comics debuts
1955 comics endings
Fiction about asteroid mining
Fiction about main-belt asteroids